Gert Andersen (born June 18, 1939) is a former Danish handball player, playing on the Danish national term

He played on the national team at the world championships in both 1964 and 1970. He played more than 530 matches for the club HG from 1957-1970 winning six Danish championships.

While still playing he trained the FIF women making them Danish Champions twice. He also won a championship with the men from Helsingør as a coach.

Privately he was married to the handball player Toni Røseler in 1963. They became parents to twins, Camilla and Charlotte of which the first mentioned became a handballplayer too.

References

Danish male handball players
1939 births
Living people
Place of birth missing (living people)